Chad Staggs is an American football coach. He served as the interim head football coach at Coastal Carolina University for the final game of the 2022 season, following the resignation of Jamey Chadwell.

Coaching career
Staggs began his coaching career in 2000, shortly after his graduation from the University of South Carolina Upstate, serving as an assistant coach at Lexington High School in Lexington, South Carolina in addition to coaching track and field at the school. In 2003, he joined the South Carolina staff as a graduate assistant. Holding this position for five years, Staggs worked with the defensive backs and linebackers, among other position groups. In 2008, Staggs departed South Carolina to take a position coaching defensive backs and special teams at Charleston Southern, though he would only stay in this position for one season.

Staggs then followed former Charleston Southern offensive coordinator Jamey Chadwell to North Greenville, where he would spend three years as the Crusaders' defensive coordinator (the final with the additional title of assistant head coach) and then to Delta State, where he spent one year as their defensive coordinator, before returning to the Division I ranks. When Chadwell was hired as Charleston Southern's head coach to begin the 2013 season, Staggs followed as his defensive coordinator. When Chadwell was suspended for one game during the 2016 season, Staggs filled his spot on the sidelines. After four seasons in his second stint in North Charleston, Staggs took an offer at Furman, where he served as the Paladins' defensive coordinator and safeties coach for two seasons.

In 2019, Staggs was hired again by Chadwell, now the head coach at Coastal Carolina, to serve as his defensive coordinator and linebackers coach. In 2021, he was put in charge of the safeties at Coastal Carolina, while still serving as the defensive coordinator.

Personal life
Staggs attended the University of South Carolina Upstate and graduated in 2000 with a Bachelor of Science in math education, and later graduated from the University of South Carolina with a Master of Science in hotel, restaurant, and tourism management in 2002. He is married to his wife, Kelli, with whom he has two children.

Head coaching record

References

Year of birth missing (living people)
Living people
Charleston Southern Buccaneers football coaches
Delta State Statesmen football coaches
Furman Paladins football coaches
North Greenville Crusaders football coaches
South Carolina Gamecocks football coaches
Coastal Carolina Chanticleers football coaches
High school football coaches in South Carolina
University of South Carolina alumni
University of South Carolina Upstate alumni